Partido Republicano may refer to:

 Portuguese Republican Party
 Republican Party (Bolivia)
 Republican Party (Chile, 1982)
 Republican Party (Chile, 2019)
 Republican Party (Panama)
 Republican Party (Puerto Rico)
 Republican Party (United States)

"Republicano" may also refer to the Republican faction in the Spanish Civil War.